Rohan Fernando (also known as Cecil Fernando) is a Canadian visual artist, painter and film maker based in Halifax, Nova Scotia.

Fernando has directed two films for the National Film Board of Canada; Trudeau's Other Children and Cecil's Journey about his ambivalence towards his identity and his trip to Jaffna, Sri Lanka, where Fernando was born. His short film, La Cucaracha, was the winner of the Guilty Pleasures Award from the 1996 Northwest Film & Video Festival. Fernando directed Snow in 2011, that follows the life of a Tsunami survivor played by Kalista Zackhariyas, which opened the ReelWorld Film Festival in Toronto after its world premiere at the Cinequest Film Festival in San Jose.

References

External links
Cecil's Journey Film Website
Zwicker Gallery Artist Profile

Film directors from Nova Scotia
Canadian painters
Canadian people of Sri Lankan Tamil descent
Sri Lankan Tamil artists
Living people
Artists from Nova Scotia
People from Halifax, Nova Scotia
Year of birth missing (living people)
Asian-Canadian filmmakers